Simshill is an area of Glasgow, Scotland. Adjacent areas are Cathcart, King's Park, Croftfoot and Castlemilk. Linn Park is to the south-west of Simshill.

The area had a high concentration of residents of Irish heritage in the postwar period, as members of the city's Irish community moved out to the suburbs from the inner city Gorbals.

Kings Park Secondary School is in the immediate area. Two other primary schools are close by: St Fillan's and St Mirin's.

Former residents of Simshill include Sir Alex Ferguson and Carol Smillie. and Alistair Albert Gray.

References

Areas of Glasgow